Rungra Island is an island in Pyongyang, North Korea, located in the middle of the Taedong River. The Chongryu Bridge on the north side and the Rungra Bridge on the south side connect the island to the rest of Pyongyang. Some of the Eight Views of Pyongyang can be seen from the island.

Recreational facilities on the island include the Rungrado 1st of May Stadium. The Rungra People's Pleasure Ground, which opened in 2012; it includes a dolphin exhibit, volleyball and basketball courts, and a wading pool.

References

Islands of North Korea
Geography of Pyongyang